was a Japanese rock band. Formed in 2006, the quartet was initially a cover band of Arctic Monkeys. Upon its release of the compilation album Love, On December 22, 2016, it was announced that they will disband for the reasons that weren't disclosed. White Ash disbanded in March 2017.

Members
Instruments adapted from White Ash's official website.

 Nobita – vocals, guitar
 Yama-san – guitar
 Aya – bass
 Tsuyoshi – drums

Discography

Albums

Studio albums

Compilation albums

Mini-albums

Singles

Guest appearances

Notes

References

External links
 

2006 establishments in Japan
2017 disestablishments in Japan
Japanese alternative rock groups
Japanese indie rock groups
Musical groups disestablished in 2017
Musical groups established in 2006
Musical quartets